The Helvetic Confessions are two documents expressing the common belief of the Calvinist churches of Switzerland.

History
The First Helvetic Confession, known also as the Second Confession of Basel, was drawn up in Basel in 1536 by Heinrich Bullinger and Leo Jud of Zürich, Kaspar Megander of Bern, Oswald Myconius and Simon Grynaeus of Basel, Martin Bucer and Wolfgang Capito of Strasbourg, with other representatives from Schaffhausen, St Gall, Mühlhausen and Biel. The first draft was written in Latin and the Zürich delegates objected to its Lutheran phraseology. However, Leo Jud's German translation was accepted by all, and after Myconius and Grynaeus had modified the Latin form, both versions were agreed to and adopted on February 26, 1536.

The Second Helvetic Confession (Latin: Confessio Helvetica posterior) was written by Bullinger in 1562 and revised in 1564 as a private exercise. It came to the notice of Elector Palatine Frederick III, who had it translated into German and published. It was attractive to some Reformed leaders as a corrective to what they saw as the overly-Lutheran statements of the Strasbourg Consensus. An attempt was made in early 1566 to have all the churches of Switzerland sign the Second Helvetic Confession as a common statement of faith. It gained a favorable hold on the Swiss churches, who had found the First Confession too short and too Lutheran. However, "the Basel clergy refused to sign the confession, stating that although they found no fault with it, they preferred to stand by their own Basel Confession of 1534".

It was adopted by the Reformed Church not only throughout Switzerland but in Scotland (1566), Hungary (1567), France (1571), Poland (1578), and after the Westminster Confession of Faith, the Scots Confession and the Heidelberg Catechism is the most generally recognized confession of the Reformed Church. The Second Helvetic Confession was also included in the United Presbyterian Church in the U.S.A.'s Book of Confessions, in 1967, and remains in the Book of Confessions adopted by the Presbyterian Church (U.S.A.).

Marian views 
Mary is mentioned several times in the Second Helvetic Confession, which expounds Bullinger's mariology.   Chapter Three quotes the angel’s message to the Virgin Mary, " – the Holy Spirit will come over you " - as an indication of the existence of the Holy Spirit and the Trinity. The Latin text described  Mary as diva, indicating her rank as a person, who dedicated herself to God.  In Chapter Nine,  the Virgin birth of Jesus is said to be conceived by the Holy Spirit and born without the participation of any man. The Second Helvetic Confession accepted the "Ever Virgin"  notion from John Calvin, which spread throughout much of Europe  with the approbation of this document in the above-mentioned countries. Bullinger's 1539 polemical treatise against idolatry expressed his belief that Mary's "sacrosanctum corpus" ("sacrosanct body") had been assumed into heaven by angels:Hac causa credimus et Deiparae virginis Mariae purissimum thalamum et spiritus sancti templum, hoc est, sacrosanctum corpus ejus deportatum esse ab angelis in coelum.

For this reason we believe that the Virgin Mary, Begetter of God, the most pure bed and temple of the Holy Spirit, that is, her most holy body, was carried to heaven by angels.The French Confession de Foy, the Scottish Confessio Fidei, the Belgian Ecclasiarum Belgicarum Confessio and the Heidelberg Catechism,  all include references to the Virgin Birth, mentioning specifically, that Jesus was born without the participation of a man.  Invocations to Mary were not tolerated, however, in light of Calvin’s position that any prayer to saints in front of an altar is prohibited.

See also
Reformation in Switzerland
Helvetic Consensus
Confession of Basel
Consensus Tigurinus

References

Literature
Louis Thomas, La Confession helvétique (Geneva, 1853);
Philip Schaff, Creeds of Christendom, i. 390-420, iii. 234-306;
Julius Müller, Die Bekenntnisschriften der reformierten Kirche (Leipzig, 1903).

External links
The Second Helvetic Confession in English Translation
 Text of the creeds from Schaff's Creeds of Christendom (vol. 3) at the Christian Classics Ethereal Library:
The First Helvetic Confession (in its original Latin and High German translation)
The Second Helvetic Confession (in its original Latin)
 History of the creeds from Schaff's Creeds of Christendom (vol. 1) at the Christian Classics Ethereal Library:
"The First Helvetic Confession"
"The Second Helvetic Confession"

1536 works
1562 works
16th-century Christian texts
Reformation in Switzerland
Reformed confessions of faith